Greendale School District is a public school district in Milwaukee County, Wisconsin. The district serves more than 2,600 students from kindergarten through twelfth grade. Greendale High School, Greendale Middle School, and three elementary schools (Canterbury, College Park, and Highland View) serve the district's students.

References

External links

Education in Milwaukee County, Wisconsin
School districts in Wisconsin
1939 establishments in Wisconsin
School districts established in 1939